Parkend railway station is located in the village of Parkend, in the Forest of Dean, Gloucestershire. It is currently the northern terminus of the Dean Forest (heritage) Railway.

History

In 1864 the Severn and Wye Railway began operating small mineral trains on its existing tramroad, but they were not satisfactory and, in 1868, the company added a broad-gauge steam railway line. However, both were removed and replaced with standard gauge tracks by 1874. The station was constructed in 1873, and subsequently opened in 1875, to enable the company to also offer passenger services alongside its freight operations which, by now, had given the railway a sizeable presence in the village, including several sidings.

A decline in mineral traffic and passenger numbers saw regular passenger services cease in 1929. The last goods train left Parkend on 26 March 1976 and much of the track was dismantled.

The line was bought by the Dean Forest Railway Preservation Society, now based at Norchard. In 2004-2005 Parkend station was extensively reconstructed, and it reopened 26 December 2005. Diesel Railcars ran the service in December 2005 and then Steam services have run into Parkend since 25 March 2006. It was then officially opened, by the Princess Royal, on 19 May 2006.

The station has two platforms, a water column, footbridge, goods shed , level crossing and a signal box (ex Maesmawr). On the 'Down' Platform there is the main station building which has a ticket office and also sells some food & drink along with some gifts. Toilets are also part of this building. The level crossing gates at the north end of the station are reputedly the longest in Britain.

Services

See also

 Dean Forest Railway
 Severn and Wye Railway

References 

Heritage railway stations in Gloucestershire
Former Severn and Wye Railway stations
Railway stations in Great Britain opened in 1875
Railway stations in Great Britain closed in 1929
Railway stations in Great Britain opened in 2006